Michael Roy Whitney  (born 24 February 1959) is a retired Australian television personality and former cricketer, who played in 12 Test matches and 38 One Day Internationals between 1981 and 1993.

Cricket career
Whitney played all of his club cricket for the Randwick Cricket Club (1976–93) in the Sydney Grade Competition. Since 2001, he has been the President of the Randwick Petersham Cricket Club. He played 94 first-class matches for New South Wales from 1980 to 1993. He is one of only three fast bowlers to take more than three hundred first-class wickets for New South Wales; the others are Geoff Lawson and Trent Copeland. He was named New South Wales Cricketer of the Year in 1988–89 and was part of four Sheffield Shield–winning teams. In five Sheffield Shield Finals appearances, he took 25 wickets at 19.28. Whitney's Test debut came in unusual circumstances. Australia was touring England in 1981, and Whitney was in England playing Northern League Cricket in Lancashire for Fleetwood Cricket Club and some County Cricket for Gloucestershire. Injuries to Rodney Hogg and Geoff Lawson in the Australian squad led to Whitney playing the final two tests of the tour. He was the first Australian Test Cricketer to be selected this way.

He later played 10 more Tests between 1987 and 1993. His best performance was in 1992. He took 11 wickets in a match against India in Perth, including 7 for 27 in the second innings. He was named Man of the Match. Whitney also took 7 for 89 in the first innings of the Fifth Test against the West Indies in Adelaide in 1989. He toured the West Indies in 1991 and Sri Lanka in 1992. He also played 38 One Day Internationals, and was Australia's leading wicket-taker and most economical bowler in the 1992 World Cup.

A notoriously poor batsman, in 1987, while playing in the Boxing Day Test against New Zealand and batting at number 11, he survived 18 deliveries and held off Sir Richard Hadlee to help secure a draw for Australia. Australia won the series 1–0 and won back the Trans-Tasman Trophy. It was Allan Border's first series win as Australian Captain. Whitney is a Life Member of Cricket New South Wales and the Randwick Petersham Cricket Club.

Rugby league administrator
On 8 March 2009, Whitney was inducted as a life member by the South Sydney Rabbitohs for his contribution in being a Director and Deputy Chairman on the Football Club Board in the critical period during the club's battle for reinstatement to the competition between 1999 and 2001. He also played a decisive role with media personality Andrew Denton and lawyer Nick Pappas (current Rabbitohs Chairman) in attracting fellow Life Member Kerry Stokes to the club as a major sponsor just before its readmission to the competition in 2002, a coup that ensured the club's ability to make its triumphant return to the NRL competition.

Television presenter
After retiring from cricket, he worked in the broadcast media from 1994 until his retirement in 2022. In 1994, Whitney hosted Great Ideas for the ABC. In 1995, he began working for the Seven Network and started hosting Sydney Weekender.  

From 1995 to 1996, he was the referee on the Australian version of TV game show Gladiators. Nationally, he was the host of Who Dares Wins (made in Australia, the show has been seen in America on cable's Game Show Network) alongside Tania Zaetta from 1996 to 1998; the show was also popular in India on the AXN network. In 2007, Whitney hosted Last Chance Learners. He also worked as a reporter at the 2000 Sydney Olympic Games and 2002 Manchester Commonwealth Games for the Seven Network.

In January 2022, the Seven Network announced that Whitney would depart Sydney Weekender, after presenting the show for almost 30 years. His role will be filled by former athlete and Seven News sports reporter Matt Shirvington.

Books
Whitney wrote a book of memoirs, Quick Whit: The Mike Whitney Story (1993), and a book of stories from his cricket-playing days and his travels, Whiticisms (1996).

Mike Whitney Band
From 2007 to 2019, Whitney toured with his cover group, The Mike Whitney Band, which mainly played gigs around Sydney, but also played in RSL clubs and pubs throughout Australia. Whitney played the tambourine and sang lead vocals for the band. After thirteen and a half years, the band played its last gig at the Bayview Tavern in the Sydney suburb of Gladesville on 8 June 2019. The band played a final encore at North Ryde RSL on 29 June 2019. Whitney now plays with a band called Oz Icons with Wayne "Junior" Pearce, Eric "Guru" Grothe, and Angry Anderson. Whitney, as of 2022, was asked to concurrently join another band called True Sports, featuring Whitney, Eric "Guru" Grothe, Richard Chee Quee, Mark Carroll, Gavin Robertson, Steve Balbi, and Musical Director Andrew Dawson, which he accepted.

References

External links 
 

1959 births
Living people
Australian television personalities
Australian cricketers
Australia Test cricketers
Australia One Day International cricketers
New South Wales cricketers
Gloucestershire cricketers
Cricketers at the 1992 Cricket World Cup
M Parkinson's World XI cricketers
Members of the Order of Australia
D. B. Close's XI cricketers
Cricketers from Sydney
Australian expatriate sportspeople in England